Willem Ooms (13 January 1897 – 24 May 1972) was a Dutch cyclist. He competed in the men's 50km event at the 1920 Summer Olympics.

See also
 List of Dutch Olympic cyclists

References

1897 births
1972 deaths
Dutch male cyclists
Olympic cyclists of the Netherlands
Cyclists at the 1920 Summer Olympics
People from Sloten, North Holland
Cyclists from North Holland